Hypselodoris placida is a species of sea slug or dorid nudibranch. It is a marine gastropod mollusk in the family Chromodorididae.

Distribution
This nudibranch is only found in Japan and the seas around Hong Kong.

Description
The hypselodoris placida has an opaque white body and a white-blue mantle edge and foot. There are black specks present on the upper dorsum and body. The gills and rhinophores are white, tipped with yellow.

This species can reach a total length of at least 20 mm.

References

 Rudman, W.B. (1983a) The Chromodorididae (Opisthobranchia: Mollusca) of the Indo-West Pacific: Chromodoris splendida, C. aspersa and Hypselodoris placida colour groups. Zoological Journal of the Linnean Society, 78: 105-173.

Chromodorididae
Gastropods described in 1949